Gianfranco Dell'Innocenti (16 November 1925 – 20 September 2012) was an Italian professional footballer.

He played for 12 seasons (287 games, one goal) in the Serie A for A.S. Roma, A.S. Lucchese Libertas 1905, SPAL 1907, Bologna F.C. 1909 and L.R. Vicenza.

His grandson Cesare Rickler is a professional footballer as well.

References

1925 births
2012 deaths
Italian footballers
Serie A players
A.S. Roma players
S.S.D. Lucchese 1905 players
S.P.A.L. players
Bologna F.C. 1909 players
L.R. Vicenza players
Association football defenders